Belonging is an English-language Welsh television drama series, produced by BBC Wales and broadcast on BBC One Wales.

The programme revolved around the lives of the Lewis family, and their various trials and tribulations in the changing environment of their South Wales town Bryncoed and modern Wales. The programme began in 1999, and its ninth and final series started in April 2008 and ended in June. A one-off ten-year anniversary special was broadcast on 16 April 2009, centring on a reunion of the Lewis family. Stephanie Parker died two days after the show ended.

Cast

External links
 

 

BBC television dramas
BBC Cymru Wales television shows
1999 British television series debuts
2008 British television series endings
Television shows set in Wales
1990s Welsh television series
2000s Welsh television series